The 1967 Petone by-election was a by-election for the electorate of Petone on 15 April 1967 during the 35th New Zealand Parliament. The by-election resulted from the death of the previous member the Hon Mick Moohan on 7 February 1967. The by-election was won by Fraser Colman, also of the Labour Party.

It was held the same day as another by-election in Fendalton.

Background
All three of the main political parties in New Zealand fielded candidates to contest the seat. At the time Petone was an electoral hive of activity with the local parliamentary seat becoming the third concurrent by-election in the area. There were also by-elections occurring for the local Maori seat, Southern Maori, following the death of Sir Eruera Tirikatene and the Petone mayoralty after Mayor Ralph Love was disqualified on a technicality.

Candidates
Labour
Petone was a safe seat for Labour and therefore there were no shortage of nominees. At least 17 candidates came forward in the seat. The most prominent of whom were:

Fraser Colman, the Labour Party's assistant general secretary and former president of the Boilermakers' Federation.
John Jeffries, a lawyer and member of the Wellington City Council since 1962.
Rolland O'Regan, a Wellington City Councillor since 1965 and former chairman of the Citizens' All Black Tour Association.
Olive Smuts-Kennedy, a lawyer and member of the Wellington City Council since 1965.

Both Bill Fox (a former MP who had lost Miramar in an upset in 1966) and Gerald O'Brien (a Wellington City Councillor and chairman of the Wellington Labour Representation Committee) were approached to stand, but declined. Fox cited his desire to retire and already having arrangements to move to Otaki, whilst O'Brien indicated that the demands of running his business would be incompatible with a parliamentary candidature.

Eventually Colman was selected to stand as Labour's candidate.

National
Richard Maunsell "Dick" Martin of Eastbourne was selected to contest the seat for the National Party. Martin had stood in Petone for National unsuccessfully in the 1960 general election where he had reduced Moohan's majority.

Social Credit
The Social Credit Party chose Colin James Whitmill, a civil servant working for the Ministry of Justice, as its candidate. Whitmill had contested Petone at the previous election.

Results
The following table gives the election results:

Notes

References

Petone 1967
1967 elections in New Zealand
Politics of the Wellington Region
April 1967 events in New Zealand
1960s in Wellington